Twelve national teams competed in the men's Olympic field hockey tournament at the 2004 Summer Olympics in Athens. Sixteen players were officially enrolled in each squad.

Pool A

The following is the Egyptian roster in the men's field hockey tournament of the 2004 Summer Olympics.

Head coach: Asem Gad

Osama Hassanein
Ahmed Ramadan
Ahmed Mandour
Mohamed Kasbr
Amro Ibrahim
Ahmed Mohamed
Yasser Mohamed (C)
Ahmed Ibrahim
Belal Enaba
Sameh Mohamed
Walid Mohamed
Adnan Ahmed
Amrou Metwalli
Mohamed El-Mallah (GK)
Mohamed El-Sayed
Sayed Hagag

The following is the German roster in the men's field hockey tournament of the 2004 Summer Olympics.

Head coach: Bernhard Peters

Clemens Arnold (GK)
Christian Schulte (GK)
Philipp Crone
Eike Duckwitz
Björn Michel
Sascha Reinelt
Christoph Eimer
Björn Emmerling
Sebastian Biederlack
Tibor Weißenborn
Florian Kunz (C)
Timo Weß
Christoph Bechmann
Christopher Zeller
Matthias Witthaus
Justus Scharowsky

The following is the British roster in the men's field hockey tournament of the 2004 Summer Olympics.

Head coach: Jason Lee

Simon Mason (GK)
Jimi Lewis (GK)
Rob Moore
Craig Parnham
Niall Stott
Tom Bertram
Mark Pearn
Jimmy Wallis
Brett Garrard
Ben Hawes
Danny Hall
Mike Johnson
Guy Fordham
Barry Middleton
Graham Dunlop
Graham Moodie

The following is the Pakistani roster in the men's field hockey tournament of the 2004 Summer Olympics.

Head coach: Roelant Oltmans

Ahmed Alam (GK)
Kashif Jawad
Mohammad Nadeem (C)
Ghazanfar Ali
Adnan Maqsood
Waseem Ahmad
Dilawar Hussain
Rehan Butt
Sohail Abbas
Ali Raza
Shabbir Muhammad
Salman Akbar (GK)
Zeeshan Ashraf
Mudassar Ali Khan
Shakeel Abbasi
Tariq Aziz

The following is the South Korean roster in the men's field hockey tournament of the 2004 Summer Olympics.

Head coach: Kim Young-kyu

Ko Dong-sik
Ji Seung-hwan
Kim Yong-bae
Kang Seong-jung
Yeo Woon-kon
Kim Jung-chul
Song Seung-tae
Lim Jung-woo
Lee Jeong-seon
Han Hyung-bae
Kim Jong-min
You Hyo-sik
Jeon Jong-ha
Kim Kyung-seok
Jang Jong-hyun
Seo Jong-ho

The following is the Spanish roster in the men's field hockey tournament of the 2004 Summer Olympics.

Head coach: Maurits Hendriks

Bernardino Herrera (GK)
Santi Freixa
Francisco Fábregas
Juan Escarré
Alex Fábregas
Pablo Amat
Eduardo Tubau
Eduardo Aguilar
Eduardo Tubau
Josep Sánchez
Víctor Sojo
Xavier Ribas
Albert Sala
Rodrigo Garza
Javier Bruses
David Alegre

Pool B

The following is the Argentine roster in the men's field hockey tournament of the 2004 Summer Olympics.

Head coach: Jorge Ruiz

Pablo Moreira (GK)
Juan Pablo Hourquebie
Maximiliano Caldas
Matias Vila
Ezequiel Paulón
Mario Almada
Carlos Retegui
Rodrigo Vila
Tomás MacCormik
Jorge Lombi
Fernando Zylberberg
Germán Orozco
Matias Paredes
Juan Manuel Vivaldi
Lucas Rey
Lucas Cammareri

The following is the Australian roster in the men's field hockey tournament of the 2004 Summer Olympics.

Head coach: Barry Dancer

Jamie Dwyer
Liam de Young
Michael McCann
Troy Elder
Robert Hammond
Nathan Eglington
Mark Knowles
Michael Brennan
Grant Schubert
Bevan George
<li value=19>Mark Hickman (GK)
<li value=23>Matthew Wells
Travis Brooks
Brent Livermore
Dean Butler
<li value=30>Stephen Mowlam (GK)

{{fh|IND}}
The following is the Indian roster in the men's field hockey tournament of the 2004 Summer Olympics.

Head coach: Gerhard Rach

Devesh Chauhan (GK)
<li value=3>Dilip Tirkey
Sandeep Singh
<li value=6>Ignace Tirkey
Prabhjot Singh
Deepak Thakur
Dhanraj Pillay
Baljit Singh Dhillon
<li value=11>Gagan Ajit Singh
Adrian D'Souza (GK)
<li value=14>William Xalco
<li value=18>Viren Rasquinha
<li value=23>Arjun Halappa
Adam Sinclair
Harpal Singh
<li value=27>Vikram Pillay

{{fh|NED}}
The following is the Dutch roster in the men's field hockey tournament of the 2004 Summer Olympics.

Head coach: Terry Walsh

Guus Vogels (GK)
Rob Derikx
Geert-Jan Derikx
Erik Jazet
<li value=6>Floris Evers
Sander van der Weide
Ronald Brouwer
<li value=10>Taeke Taekema
<li value=11>Marten Eikelboom
Jeroen Delmee (C)
Klaas Veering (GK)
Teun de Nooijer
Karel Klaver
<li value=18>Rob Reckers
Matthijs Brouwer
<li value=22>Jesse Mahieu

{{fh|NZL}}
The following is the New Zealand roster in the men's field hockey tournament of the 2004 Summer Olympics.

Head coach: Kevin Towns

Simon Towns (C)
Mitesh Patel
Dave Kosoof
Darren Smith
Wayne McIndoe
Dion Gosling
Blair Hopping
Dean Couzins
<li value=11>Umesh Parag
<li value=14>Bevan Hari
<li value=16>Paul Woolford (GK)
Kyle Pontifex (GK)
Phil Burrows
Hayden Shaw
James Nation
<li value=24>Gareth Brooks

{{fh|RSA}}
The following is the South African roster in the men's field hockey tournament of the 2004 Summer Olympics.

Head coach: Paul Revington

David Staniforth (GK)
[[Craig Jackson (field hockey)|Craig Jackson]] (c)
[[Craig Fulton]]
[[Bruce Jacobs (field hockey)|Bruce Jacobs]]
[[Gregg Clark]]
[[Iain Evans (field hockey)|Iain Evans]]
[[Emile Smith]]
[[Jody Paul]]
<li value=13>[[Steve Evans (field hockey)|Steve Evans]]
[[Eric Rose-Innes]]
<li value=18>[[Wayne Denne]]
[[Chris Hibbert]] (GK)
[[Ian Symons]]
<li value=25>[[Ryan Ravenscroft]]
[[Denzil Dolley]]
[[Greg Nicol]]
{{div col end}}<section end=RSA />

References
{{reflist}}

External links
[http://www.fihockey.org/vsite/vnavsite/page/directory/0,10853,1181-151931-169147-nav-list,00.html FIH Archive]

{{Field hockey at the Summer Olympics}}

[[Category:Field hockey at the 2004 Summer Olympics – Men's tournament|Squads]]
[[Category:Olympic field hockey squads|2004]]
[[Category:Field hockey players at the 2004 Summer Olympics|*]]